MGM National Harbor is a casino hotel in National Harbor, Maryland, just outside of Washington, D.C. It opened on December 8, 2016, constructed at a cost of $1.4 billion. It is owned by Vici Properties and operated by MGM Resorts International.

History

MGM Resorts International received a license in December 2013 to develop a $925-million resort (later increased to $1.2 billion) in National Harbor. The company received the license after competing with bids from Penn National Gaming to develop a $700-million facility at its Rosecroft Raceway and Greenwood Racing to develop a $761-million facility near Maryland Route 210.

Construction on MGM National Harbor began in April, 2014. It opened on December 8, 2016.

In September 2017, MGM Growth Properties purchased the land and buildings of MGM National Harbor from MGM Resorts International for $1.2 billion in a leaseback transaction. Vici Properties acquired MGM Growth, including MGM National Harbor, in 2022.

Incidents

MBE participation 
In April 2015, the MGM casino was sued by a group of Prince George's County businesses who claimed the casino didn't comply with minority business enterprise (MBE) contracting standards.

Child electric shock
On June 26, 2018, a seven-year-old girl suffered traumatic brain injury while visiting the casino. Due to a faulty installation of a device meant to control the electrical flow to the rail lighting, Zynae Green suffered an electric shock and was left requiring the use of a wheelchair. Despite the family's pleas for help, MGM security did not initiate resuscitation, MGM stating "the guards followed protocol responding to the incident and determined that Zynae was breathing and did not need CPR". Prince George's County Police Officers started resuscitation upon arrival. The incident prompted an FBI investigation and the family has not been compensated more than a year after the incident.

Cheating
In 2019, a baccarat dealer who worked at the casino was sentenced to 18 months in prison for a cheating scheme. Ming Zhang showed his co-conspirators cards before they were dealt, who split the winnings with him.

Boxing death
Russian boxer Maxim Dadashev died on July 23, 2019, from injuries suffered during a July 19 boxing match at the Theater at MGM National Harbor.

Fighting 
Multiple brawls have been reported at the facility, including on the casino floor. During the casino's first night of operations, video emerged of an attendee who was beaten while on the floor, while another person grabbed a stool.  In 2022, brawls were reported in the dining area between multiple patrons, with no security visible. The casino canceled the Thursday event where the incident occurred.

Robbery of winners
In 2020, two winners were robbed of more than $40,000 in winnings after leaving the casino and shot during the crime. The victims were followed by the assailants from the casino and robbed in Woodbridge, Virginia, where one of them lived and the other was shot.

In another 2020 incident, a casino patron and hotel guest was shot and robbed of his casino winnings. After returning to his room in the hotel portion of the facility, Nathaniel Nagbe opened the door to find two armed men accompanied by a woman he knew. After he refused to open the hotel safe that contained more than $60,000 in winnings, Nagbe was shot in his stomach and fled down 17 flights of stairs before a valet called 911.

Design
The white exterior of the building is in keeping with the marble used in many of the buildings in Washington DC. The organization of the casino is along a central axis, similar to the arrangement for the National Mall. The design was provided by HKS, Inc. while the architect of record for the project is SmithGroupJJR.

Features 
MGM National Harbor includes a 23-story hotel with 308 rooms,  in gaming space, retail space, a spa, seven restaurants, a 3,000-seat theater with seven VIP suites,  of meeting and event space, and a parking garage for 4,800 cars.

The resort's public spaces feature a permanent collection of art inspired by the Washington metropolitan area and developed in collaboration with Prince George's County Arts and Humanities Council, Atlantic Arts, and RareCulture. Artists, sculptors, and photographers featured in the collection include Alice Aycock, Charles Hinman, Chul Hyun Ahn, John Safer, Liao Yibai, Margaret Boozer, Martha Jackson Jarvis, Sam Gilliam, and Terry O'Neill. The west entrance to the facility features a  iron archway composed of "found objects" such as farming tools, children's toys, wheels and axes designed by Bob Dylan.

See also
 List of casinos in Maryland

External links

References

Casinos in Maryland
Tourist attractions in Prince George's County, Maryland
MGM Resorts International
2016 establishments in Maryland
Casino hotels
Hotels in Maryland
Resorts in Maryland
Casinos completed in 2016
Hotel buildings completed in 2016
Oxon Hill, Maryland